The 1981 UCLA Bruins football team was an American football team that represented the University of California, Los Angeles during the 1981 NCAA Division I-A football season.  In their sixth year under head coach Terry Donahue, the Bruins compiled a 7–4–1 record (5–2–1 Pac-10), finished in a tie for fourth place in the Pacific-10 Conference, and lost to Michigan in the 1981 Astro-Bluebonnet Bowl.

UCLA's offensive leaders in 1981 were quarterback Tom Ramsey with 1,793 passing yards, running back Kevin Nelson with 883 rushing yards, and wide receiver Cormac Carney with 539 receiving yards.
 
This was the Bruins' final season at the Los Angeles Memorial Coliseum, their home field since 1928, sharing with the USC Trojans.  UCLA moved to the Rose Bowl in Pasadena for the 1982 season.

Schedule

Personnel

Season summary

at USC

Norm Johnson's game-winning 46-yard field goal attempt was blocked in the final seconds and UCLA lost its opportunity to play in the Rose Bowl.

1982 NFL Draft
The following players were drafted into professional football following the season.

References

UCLA
UCLA Bruins football seasons
UCLA Bruins football
UCLA Bruins football